Per Husby (born 2 April 1949 in Oslo) is a Norwegian jazz pianist, composer, teacher, civil engineer, and orchestra leader.

Career 
Husby was raised in Oslo together with other jazz enthusiasts like jazz journalist Knut Borge.

He studied piano at the Music Conservatory of Oslo (1962–67), and became a siv.ing. in acoustics (under Asbjørn Krokstad) at the Norwegian Institute of Technology (1973), followed up with studies in jazz at Berklee in Boston. In Trondheim (1971–80), he worked with the local big band Bodega Band where he (and bassist Jan Tro) wrote much original music for recordings. Later, Husby performed in groups led by Asmund Bjørken and Bjørn Alterhaug. He was a musical director at the local theatre Trøndelag Teater (1975–80). Husby led his own septet, (1975–78), quintet (1980–83), and released records with his 13-piece Per Husby Dedication Orchestra (13 tracks).

From 1980 in Oslo, he was leader of the Federation of Norwegian Jazz musicians (1983–85), and co-edited the Norwegian Jazz Magazine Jazznytt (1981–84). Over 20 years, he made regular engagements as a pianist/orchestra leader on Norwegian TV Norwegian Broadcasting Corporation, including 11 years as a musical director for the "memory lane" TV series Da Capo.

Husby has produced and played with Hilde Louise Asbjørnsen, and plays in the Quartet of tenor saxophonist Bodil Niska as well as with singer Laila Dalseth. He has through the years worked as an accompanist for visiting jazz soloists such as Chet Baker (heard on The Improviser, Cadence Jazz Records), Clark Terry, Joe Henderson, Pepper Adams, Kenny Wheeler, James Moody and Karin Krog.

Honors 
1985: Molderosen at the Moldejazz
1985: Work of the year 1985, elected by the composer's organisation NOPA in for Poesi
1985: Spellemannprisen in the class Jazz, for the album Dedications
1989: Buddyprisen by The Norwegian jazz federation's honorary award

Discography 
Per Husby Septet, Peacemaker (LP /CD 1976 Gemini Records, 2003). With Knut Riisnæs/Bjørn Johansen/Harald Bergersen saxophone Bernt Anker Steen trumpet, Carl Morten Iversen bass and Svein-Erik Gaardvik drums
The Improviser (Cadence Jazz Records, 1983).  With  Chet Baker, Bjørn Kjellemyr, Espen Rud, Ole Jacob Hansen and Terje Venaas
The Per Husby Dedication Orchestra, Dedications (Hot Club Records, 1985) won Spellemannprisen 1985,
The Per Husby Dedication Orchestra, Your eyes (NOPA Records, 1987).
Notes for nature (Odin Records, 1990) – including jazz adaptions of his music for the prize-winning TV documentary NRK-programme 2048 (1988)
If you could see me now (Gemini Records, 1996).  Recorded in New York City with Frank Wess, Grady Tate, Jim Pugh, Jay Leonhart, Bucky Pizzarelli, Chris Potter, Howard Johnson a.o.
Anne Lande and Husby, Sakte sanger (Park Grammofon, 2006) with music by Alf Prøysen, Inger Hagerup, Antonio Carlos Jobim and others
Anne Lande and Husby, Helt Nær (Park Grammofon, 2009).

Works 
 Poesi (1985)
 Two pieces for brass quintet (1987)
 Stråler mellom fjell (2000)
 Inverness wedding (2001)
 Mythos (2002)

 Vårsong/For ein dag (2002)
 Half a nice day (2002)

References 

1944 births
Living people
20th-century Norwegian pianists
21st-century Norwegian pianists
Norwegian jazz pianists
Norwegian jazz composers
Male jazz composers
Norwegian translators
Spellemannprisen winners
Norwegian civil engineers
Hot Club Records artists
Gemini Records artists
Musicians from Oslo
Norwegian male pianists
20th-century Norwegian male musicians
21st-century Norwegian male musicians
Bodega Band members